The Utah Utes 2003 football team represented the University of Utah in the 2003 NCAA Division I-A football season. This was Urban Meyer's first year coaching at the school, after being hired from Bowling Green. The team played its home games in Rice-Eccles Stadium.

Schedule

Rankings

Game summaries

Utah State

Texas A&M

California

Colorado State

Oregon

San Diego State

UNLV

New Mexico

Air Force

Wyoming

BYU

Utah beat BYU for the second straight year with this 3–0 victory. There was heavy snow fall for much of the game. The victory snapped BYU's NCAA record for scoring in 361 straight games—BYU's first shutout since a 20–0 loss to Arizona State on September 25, 1975.

Liberty Bowl: Utah vs. Southern Miss

References

Utah
Utah Utes football seasons
Liberty Bowl champion seasons
Mountain West Conference football champion seasons
Utah Utes football